José Antonio Monago Terraza is a Spanish politician who belongs to the People's Party (PP) who served as President of the Regional Government of Extremadura, the Extremaduran regional administration, from 2011 to 2015. Outside of political life, Monago received a Doctorate in Law from the University of Salamanca He became Extremaduran regional leader of the PP in 2007 and served as a city councillor in Badajoz and as a PP deputy in the Extremaduran Assembly. The Extremaduran Assembly appointed him to the Spanish Senate in 2008.

Biography
Monago was chosen as the PP candidate for President of the Regional Government of Extremadura in the 2011 Extremaduran elections. The elections saw the PP emerge as the largest party in Extremadura for the first time, although they fell one seat short of an absolute majority. The outgoing President, Guillermo Fernández Vara of the PSOE, attempted to secure re-election by forming a pact with United Left (IU). However IU declined to support the PSOE and abstained in the Presidential vote with the result that Monago became the first PP President of the Regional Government of Extremadura. Nine months later, Monago's minority government is threatened to collapse after the IU agreed to re-negotiate with PSOE after parliamentary elections in Andalusia and Asturias on 25 March 2012.

In November 2014, it was leaked that Monago could have used public money of the Senate in 2009 and 2010 to make 32 visits to his then girlfriend in the Canary Islands He promised to give the money back, but he later took that promise back.

This issue reached the Supreme Court, which closed the matter because the journalistic information was not credited. "The complaint was inadmissible for not being the facts constituting any criminal offense". Currently, José Antonio Monago is Chairman of the Senate Budget Committee.

References

External links

Interview in El Pais, 19 June 2011

1966 births
Living people
Members of the 9th Senate of Spain
Members of the 13th Senate of Spain
Members of the 14th Senate of Spain
People from the Province of Badajoz
People's Party (Spain) politicians
Presidents of the Regional Government of Extremadura
University of Salamanca alumni
Members of the 6th Assembly of Extremadura
Members of the 7th Assembly of Extremadura
Members of the 8th Assembly of Extremadura
Members of the 9th Assembly of Extremadura
Members of the 10th Assembly of Extremadura